The 2008 Nikon Indy 300 was the 19th and final race of the 2008 IndyCar Series season.  It was held on 26 October 2008 on the Surfers Paradise Street Circuit in Queensland, Australia.

It was the first time the race was held for the Indy Racing League after 17 years as a Champ Car race. The race did not count towards the 2008 IndyCar season points as the race date was held after the Chicagoland Speedway 300, which was preset as the season finale prior to the merger of Champ Car and IRL. The previous non-points race had been the 1992 Marlboro Challenge, a CART all-star race.

The race was won by an Australian driver for the first time in the 18-year history of the event with Ryan Briscoe winning for Team Penske after leading much of the race, while pushed hard by the near-local, New Zealander Scott Dixon. Ryan Hunter-Reay emerged from an entertaining dice to complete the podium in third position.

Team changes
With the championship decided, some teams used the race as a prelude to the 2009 season. Dario Franchitti made his return to IndyCar after a failed attempt at breaking into NASCAR, taking Dan Wheldon's seat at Chip Ganassi Racing, with Wheldon moving on to his 2009 team, Panther Racing, replacing Vítor Meira. Meira moved to his new team, A. J. Foyt Enterprises.

Qualifying
Rain fell on early parts of qualifying which caught several cars out, most notably Danica Patrick who hit the wall on her out lap wrecking the nose of the car and putting her out of qualifying without a lap recorded. The rain stopped fairly early and Ryan Hunter-Reay made best fist of the conditions, topping Group 1 two and a half tenths of a second clear of Alex Tagliani. The group was well spaced with Vítor Meira and E. J. Viso almost a second behind the top two and well clear of the final two cars to advance, Mario Moraes and Ryan Briscoe. Graham Rahal missed the cut by less than two-tenths of a second with Oriol Servià the other car unlucky to miss out.

Will Power continued to show the pace he had shown through practice to top the second group, almost four second faster the Group 1 as the track dried. Tony Kanaan shadowed the local hero with Justin Wilson within a tenth of Kanaan. Scott Dixon and returning teammate Dario Franchitti progressed while again a Penske car sat on the bubble, Hélio Castroneves the last car to make it into Group 2. Marco Andretti was well down on Castroneves while Dan Wheldon made a troubled debut for his new team, missing the cut by almost two seconds.

Dixon topped Section 2 track times improving from over 1:50 to 1:39.2049 for Dixon's best lap. Castroneves improved to second ahead of Kanaan, who would subsequently lose his bets lap and drop out of the top six, Franchitti and Briscoe. Power having led much of the session stopped early and had a nervous wait as his time was rapidly bettered, but made it through with Hunter-Reay joining the Firestone Fast Six.

Dixon, Power and Briscoe swapped top times early until Power started to dominate. With time running out Dixon recorded a 1:35.7672, the fastest lap time recorded in all of qualifying with Briscoe and Franchitti filling the top three when on his last lap Power backed off and found something for a last charge, recording a 1:34.9451, smashing the Fast Six field by eight-tenths of a second.

Qualifying results

Race
Justin Wilson pitted on the warm-up lap with the gearbox sticking in third, but rejoined to start from the back. Will Power immediately dominated the start, pulling a two-second lead on the first lap. Scott Dixon started second but after being forced to cut the first chicane was relegated behind Ryan Briscoe by the officials.

Mario Moraes and Vítor Meira clashed at the second chicane with Meira spinning without hitting anyone. A few lap later Moraes caused the first safety car, clipping the turn 2 chicane, breaking the right rear corner of the car. Townsend Bell was eliminated after a clash with Helio Castroneves which wrecked Bell's steering. Later the same lap Castroneves had a right rear puncture caused by Danica Patrick's front wing while passing the Andretti Green Racing driver.

Lap 17 saw the end of Power's dominance of the meeting as he crashed at the Bartercard chicane, which put Briscoe into the lead ahead of Dixon. Briscoe pitted for fuel immediately upon catching backmarker Patrick, but Dixon waited another lap and was held up behind her. At the same time Graham Rahal touched the rear of Car 20, spinning the Vision Racing car at the bottom corner and Ed Carpenter stopped as well, almost blocking the track. The emerging safety car almost hit Dixon as he completed his stop.

Behind the safety car Patrick stopped and stalled, almost hitting the stationary car of Carpenter. Dario Franchitti clipped the tyre bundle on the inside of the same chicane and spun and stalled bringing out the safety car. After the restart Tony Kanaan had the right rear suspension break without apparent reason.

After the second round of pitstops the battle for third between Alex Tagliani and Ryan Hunter-Reay was interrupted by Dario Franchitti as poor pitstop and a poor pit position for Conquest Racing saw Tagliani drop several position behind EJ Viso. Viso later would twice have to give up spots for cutting chicanes, first to Tagliani, then Castroneves. Lap 48 saw Jaime Camara go straight on and stalled the car attempting to recover.

In the races closing stages Dixon closed in on Briscoe, the two remaining local drivers lapping significantly faster than the rest of the field. Ed Carpenter hit the wall at turn 3 on the last lap but it did not affect the lead battle and Briscoe won his home race ahead of Dixon. Ryan Hunter-Reay finished third.

Race result
Final results sourced from:.

Support categories
The 2008 Nikon Indy 300 shared the top billing with Round 11 of the 2008 V8 Supercar Championship series, as well as three support categories.

Notes
It was the last held in Nikon Indy 300, starting for 2009, the race changed to a V8 Supercar race for 2009 and onwards.

References

Nikon Indy 300
Nikon Indy 300
Gold Coast Indy 300